Hamilton Paramedic Service  is the designated service provider for emergency medical services (ambulance) in the City of Hamilton, Ontario.

Additional vehicles are occasionally added as a temporary measure as demand increases. Hamilton EMS operates from 18 joint EMS/fire stations, and two EMS exclusive operation centres.

Paramedic Stations 

Station #1 JOHN - 35 - 43 John Street North Transport Unit 2031 ALS and Transport Unit 2010
 Station #3 GARTH - 965 Garth Street. Transport Unit 2015 ALS
 Station #4 UPPER SHERMAN - 729 Upper Sherman Avenue. Transport Unit 2032 ALS
 Station #7 QUIGLEY - 225 Quigley Road. Transport Unit 2004 ALS
 Station #9 KENILWORTH - 125 Kenilworth Avenue North. Transport Unit 2002 ALS
 Station #10 NORFOLK - 1455 Main Street West. Transport Unit 2003 ALS
 Station #12 STONEY CREEK - 199 Highway 8, Hamilton. Transport Unit 2009
 Station #15 ARVIN - 415 Arvin Avenue, Stoney Creek. Transport Unit 2038 ALS ERV 2350
 Station #17 ISAAC BROCK - 363 Isaac Brock Drive. Transport Unit 2026 ALS
 Station #18 BINBROOK - 2636 Highway #56, Binbrook. Transport Unit 2011 ALS
 Station #19 MOUNT HOPE - 3303 Homestead Drive, Mount Hope Transport Unit 2039
 Station #20 ANCASTER/GARNER - 661 Garner Road East, Ancaster. Transport Unit 2029 ERV 2373
 Station #21 ANCASTER/WILSON - 365 Wilson St. West, Ancaster. Transport Unit 2009 ALS
 Station #23 DUNDAS - Memorial Square, Dundas. Unit Transport Unit 2018 ALS
 Station #24 WATERDOWN - 256 Parkside Drive, Waterdown. Emergency Transport Unit, Emergency Response Vehicle 
 Station #25 GREENSVILLE - 361 Old Brock Road, Hamilton. Transport Unit 2093
 Station #32 LIMERIDGE - 1000 Limeridge Rd East. Transport Unit 2034 ALS and 2011, 2028, ALS District 2 Supervisor, District 2 Emergency Support Unit 
 Station #30 VICTORIA/FLEET- 489 Victoria Avenue North Transport Unit Multiples (24/7) and Multiple Demand Transport Units (Stores) Logistics Supervisor, District 1 Supervisors 2382 2381 2383 2385, Scheduling Offices, Logistic Technicians, Bariatric Unit 2256 & 2255, District 1 Emergency Support Unit. **Paramedics in Hamilton utilize stations with the Hamilton Fire Department.

Services 
 Primary Care Paramedics (PCPs)
 Advanced Care Paramedics (ACPs)
 Land Transport Ambulances
 Emergency Response Vehicles/Paramedic Rapid Response Units
 Emergency Support - Mass Casualty Units 
 Tiered Emergency Medical Responses (with Hamilton Fire Department)
 Community Paramedicine Program
 Remote Patient Monitoring 
 Social Navigator Program
 Bariatric Transport Unit
 Neo Natal Transport Team
 Public Access Defibrillation (PAD) program
 Community Programs - Public education and safety promotion

Transport Destinations 
Hamilton Paramedic Service transports patients to Hamilton General Hospital, Juravinski Hospital (formerly Henderson Hospital), St. Joseph's Healthcare Hamilton or McMaster Children's Hospital/McMaster University Medical Centre. Patient's transported by ambulance are not accepted at Urgent Care Centres in Hamilton[1]

Communications 
Hamilton Paramedic Service operates under the direction of Hamilton Central Ambulance Communications Center or CACC "Kaack"). CACC is operated by the Ministry of Health and Long Term Care Emergency Health Services Branch and is not operated/owned/controlled by the City of Hamilton.

Emergency calls to 9-1-1 are first answered by the local PSAP or Public Safety Answering Point. If an ambulance is required you are then connected/transferred via 9-1-1 to the Hamilton Central Ambulance Communications Center if you are calling locally.

CACC prioritizes the urgency of requests, determine the appropriate destination hospital to meet patient needs and provide callers with pre-arrival first aid instructions. The centres deploy, coordinate and direct the movement of all ambulances and emergency response vehicles within geographic catchment areas to ensure an integrated healthcare system. Computer-aided wide-area central dispatching and technology, such as automatic vehicle location using global positioning systems, help the dispatcher to determine and assign the closest available and most appropriate ambulance to each emergency.

See also

Paramedicine in Canada
List of EMS Services in Ontario
Paramedics in Canada
Emergency Medical Services in Canada

Emergency Services in Hamilton, Ontario
Hamilton Police Service (Ontario)

References

 HES

Ambulance services in Canada
Municipal government of Hamilton, Ontario